Miss Baltic Sea 1991 is the first annual Miss Baltic Sea. Countries from the Baltic Sea has competed a pageant
and only 9 contestants. Miss Finland has won.

Placements

Contestants
  - Nina Andersson
  - Ilka Endres
  - Ewa Szymczak 
  - Olga Fedorova

1991 beauty pageants